Breitenburg is an Amt ("collective municipality") in the district of Steinburg, in Schleswig-Holstein, Germany. The seat of the Amt is in Breitenburg.

The Amt Breitenburg consists of the following municipalities:
Auufer
Breitenberg 
Breitenburg
Kollmoor 
Kronsmoor 
Lägerdorf 
Moordiek 
Münsterdorf 
Oelixdorf 
Westermoor
Wittenbergen

References

Ämter in Schleswig-Holstein